Gillberga is a small village on the island of Öland, Kalmar County, Sweden. it belongs to the municipality of Borgholm.

Populated places in Borgholm Municipality